Glasgow Springburn was a constituency of the House of Commons of the Parliament of the United Kingdom from 1918 until the 2005 general election, when it was largely replaced by the Glasgow North East constituency.

The last and longest-serving Member of Parliament, Michael Martin, formerly a member of the Labour Party, was elected Speaker of the House of Commons in 2000 and held the post until his resignation in 2009. By convention, the major parties (Labour, Conservative Party and Liberal Democrats) do not stand against a sitting Speaker in a general election, and in the 2001 and 2005 general elections he stood as "Speaker seeking re-election." Other parties, including the Scottish National Party, however, continued to contest the seat.

Boundaries

1918–1950: "That portion of the city which is bounded by a line commencing at a point on the municipal boundary on the south-east side of Cumbernauld Road, where that road is intersected by the east side of the Caledonian Railway (Glasgow Lines), thence northward to the centre line of Cumbernauld Road, thence south-westward and westward along the centre line of Cumbernauld Road and Alexandra Parade to the centre line of Castle Street, thence northward along the centre line of Castle Street and Springburn Road to the centre line of Fountainwell Road, thence north-westward along the centre line of Fountainwell Road to the centre line of the North British Railway (Edinburgh and Glasgow Line), thence northward along the centre line of the said North British Railway to a Point on the municipal boundary about 327 yards north of the centre of Hawthorn Street, where the said North British Railway intersects that street, thence northward, eastward, southward, eastward, southward, westward, south-eastward and southwestward along the municipal boundary to the point of commencement."

1950–1955: The County of the City of Glasgow wards of Cowcaddens, Cowlairs, and Springburn.

1955–1974: The County of the City of Glasgow wards of Cowlairs and Springburn.

1974–1983: The County of the City of Glasgow wards of Cowlairs, Dennistoun, and Springburn.

1983–1997: The City of Glasgow District electoral divisions of Alexandra Park/Dennistoun and Keppochhill/Cowlairs.

1997–2005: The City of Glasgow District electoral divisions of Carntyne/Robroyston, Royston/Dennistoun, and Springburn/Barmulloch.

Members of Parliament

Election results

Elections in the 1910s

Elections in the 1920s

Elections in the 1930s

Elections in the 1940s

Elections in the 1950s

Elections in the 1960s

Elections in the 1970s

Elections in the 1980s

Elections in the 1990s

Elections in the 2000s

References

Historic parliamentary constituencies in Scotland (Westminster)
Constituencies of the Parliament of the United Kingdom established in 1918
Constituencies of the Parliament of the United Kingdom disestablished in 2005
Politics of Glasgow
Springburn